NK Nehaj is a Croatian football club based in the town of Senj.

They won the 2018 county cup.

References

External links
NK Nehaj at Nogometni magazin 

Football clubs in Croatia
Football clubs in Lika-Senj County
Association football clubs established in 1920
1920 establishments in Croatia